NOFX / The Spits is a split EP between punk bands NOFX and the Spits.  It was released on November 23, 2010 on vinyl only but is now available for digital download.

Track listing

Personnel
NOFX
 Fat Mike – vocals, bass on tracks 1 and 2
 Eric Melvin – guitar, vocals on tracks 1 and 2
 El Hefe – guitar, vocals on tracks 1 and 2
 Erik Sandin – drums on tracks 1 and 2

The Spits
 Sean Wood — guitar and vocals on tracks 3 and 4
 Erin Wood — bass and vocals on tracks 3 and 4
 Lance Phelps — drums on tracks 3 and 4
 Gregory Toumassian— Keyboard on tracks 3 and 4

References

NOFX albums
The Spits albums
2010 EPs
Split EPs
Fat Wreck Chords EPs